David Pender Richards  (born 3 June 1952) is the chairman of Prodrive, chairman of Motorsport UK (The Royal Automobile Club Motor Sports Association Ltd), former chairman of Aston Martin, a former team principal of the BAR and Benetton Formula One motor racing teams and as a co-driver, World Rally Champion in 1981. He lives with his wife, Karen, in Warwickshire and has three children.  In the 2005 New Year Honours List Richards was appointed a CBE for his services to motorsport and in 2017 was inducted into the Motor Sport Hall of Fame and received the Spirit of Le Mans award from the Automobile Club de l’Ouest (ACO). In 2019 he received the Autocar Outstanding Leader Award.

Education
Richards grew up in the Vale of Clwyd, attending Brynhyfryd School in Ruthin, Denbighshire. He passed his driving test on his 17th birthday. At the age of only 17 years and 3 months he became the then youngest person in the UK to hold a private pilot's licence and was awarded an RAF university scholarship. After completing his first year of A-Levels, he left school to spend five years studying for his articles as a British Chartered Accountant. It was during this period that he established his early career as a professional rally co-driver winning his first national rally championship with Tony Drummond in 1974.

Early career

In 1976, he established his own motorsport consultancy and created a new rally series in the Middle East, before joining the British Leyland factory team, co-driving Tony Pond, winning the Tour of Britain. In the same year, he married his wife Karen.

The following year he took up the position of team manager for Fiat, before returning to competition with the Ford factory team in 1979. Here he formed a successful and long-standing partnership with the Finnish rally driver, Ari Vatanen. The two won both the British and Scandinavian Championships before going on to win the World Rally Championship in a Ford Escort RS1800 in 1981.

After winning the World Rally Championship he took the decision to retire from active competition and focussed his attention on organising rallies on behalf of Rothmans in the Middle East and setting up his own rally team. In 1984, Richards brought together Rothmans and Porsche and took his next major step in motorsport management, creating Prodrive to engineer and run the newly formed Rothmans Porsche Rally Team in the European and Middle East Rally Championships.

Prodrive early years
In 1984, the Porsche Rothmans Rally Team won the Middle East Rally Championship and finished runners up in the European Championship in its first year of competition.

Rapid expansion of his new Prodrive company led to a move to a new facility at Banbury, Oxfordshire in 1986. The same year, Richards' team ran a privately entered MG Metro 6R4 in the British and Irish rally championships, alongside the Porsche programme. The following year saw Prodrive begin a six-year relationship with BMW in both rallying and touring car racing. His BMW team won three consecutive British Touring Car Championships (BTCC) in 1988, 1989, and 1990, while the BMW rally teams dominated tarmac rallying across Europe winning the Belgian and French series with the Group A BMW M3 rally car.

A pivotal meeting with Fuji Heavy Industries at the Safari Rally in 1989, led to the creation of the Subaru World Rally Team (SWRT).

Subaru World Rally Team
Under Richards' direction the team embarked on an ambitious programme, initially in the British, and subsequently the Asia-Pacific and World Rally Championships (WRC). It was Richards who, in 1990, saw the raw talent of young driver Colin McRae, and later Richard Burns and Petter Solberg. He personally oversaw the development of their early careers, leading to two British titles for Subaru and McRae in 1991 and 1992, and a further title for Burns in 1993. Drivers such as Carlos Sainz, Juha Kankkunen, Possum Bourne, Markku Alen, Ari Vatanen and Tommi Mäkinen all competed for the team.

The team's highlight came in 1995 when the Subaru World Rally Team and Colin McRae achieved the double of the Drivers' and Manufacturers' World Rally titles. Under Richards' direction, the team went on to win two further Manufacturers' titles, in 1996 and 1997. Richard Burns and Petter Solberg won further Drivers' titles in 2001 and 2003, respectively.

At the end of 2008, Subaru decided to withdraw from the World Rally Championship after 18 years, ending one of the longest and most successful partnerships in the sport.

Prodrive circuit racing
In 1987 Prodrive entered into what was to become a long-standing partnership with BMW in the British Touring Car Championship. They took the Class B title three times, from 1988 to 1990, winning outright in 1988 with Frank Sytner. BMW UK ended the partnership with Prodrive at the end of the 1992 season following a change in the technical regulations.

After two years away, Prodrive returned to the British Touring Car Championship in 1995 with the Alfa Romeo. In 1997 and 1998 Prodrive ran the Honda Touring Car Team, before working with Ford in 1999 and 2000. After re-engineering the Ford Mondeo, the team won the BTCC title in 2000 with Alain Menu. It was the last year Super Touring Cars would compete in the BTCC.

In 2001, Richards took Prodrive into sports car racing as the team designed a new Ferrari 550 GTS Maranello to compete in the FIA GT championship. This was a privately backed programme, independent from Ferrari. Between 2001 and 2004, ten cars were built and the highlight came in 2003, when the team won the GT1 class at Le Mans against the factory-backed Corvettes. In December 2003, Richards announced that Prodrive had signed an agreement with Aston Martin to take the British sports car manufacturer back into motor racing with the formation of a new team called Aston Martin Racing. The new Aston Martin DBR9 was unveiled at Gaydon in November 2004 and first competed at the 12 Hours of Sebring in 2005, winning on its debut. The DBR9 won two Le Mans GT1 titles in 2007 and 2008, the latter with the car running in the distinctive Gulf Oil livery.

In 2009, the team launched its new LMP1 car, the DBR1-2, which featured a Lola chassis, mated to a modified production-based DBR9 engine. The team won the Le Mans Series in 2009 and finished fourth at Le Mans the same year as the highest placed petrol powered car. In September 2010 at Silverstone, Richards unveiled an all-new Aston Martin LMP1 car to compete at Le Mans in 2011.  The Aston Martin Racing team now competes in the FIA World Endurance Championship (WEC) with the production-based Vantage GTE. In 2016 the team won the FIA WEC GT Teams' and Drivers' titles; in 2020 the FIA WEC GT Drivers' and Manufacturers' titles as well as Le Mans in 2017 and 2020 and the FIA WEC GT Am title in 2017. 

Prodrive continued to compete in the European Touring Car Championship in 2002 with Volvo and in 2003 launched the Ford Performance Racing team in the Australian V8 Supercar Series.  The Australian team was sold in 2012.

Bahrain Raid Xtreme Dakar
In 2020 David Richards created a partnership with the Kingdom of Bahrain which saw the creation of a new team to compete at the Dakar rally, Bahrain Raid Xtreme. Prodrive developed an all new car, the Prodrive Hunter, which debuted on the Dakar in 2021, finishing 5th, the highest placing for any team on its debut.  The team returned to the Dakar in 2022, with Hunter now running on Prodrive EcoPower, a sustainable fuel made by Coryton Advanced fuels from agricultural waste.  It was the first car to win a stage of the Dakar running on a sustainable fuel. The team's drivers, nine-time World Rally champion, Sebastien Loeb, and Orlando Terranova, finished 2nd and fourth respectively.  The team now competes in the new FIA World Rally-Raid Championship.

X44 Extreme E
In 2021 Sir Lewis Hamilton chose Prodrive to run his new team X44 in the new Extreme E electric racing series. In the inaugural season the team finished second and is now competing in the 2022 championship.

Formula One
In 1997, when Flavio Briatore was fired as Director of the Benetton team, Richards replaced him. However, his tenure only lasted one year, as he could not agree a long term strategy with the team-owning Benetton family.

When the BAR team was restructuring after the departure of Craig Pollock in 2001, the owners BAT (British American Tobacco) brought in Prodrive to run the team with Richards as its Team Principal. Under his direction there was an immediate improvement in performance, ultimately leading to the team taking second place in the 2004 F1 Constructors' Championship. Richards also brought Jenson Button to the team and made him lead driver providing the majority of their championship points in 2004. This success led to BAT selling a 45% share of the team to Honda in late 2004. With Prodrive having completed its management contract with BAT, Richards stood down as Team Principal and Prodrive's then managing director Nick Fry assumed this role.

His Prodrive company entered a bid to enter a Formula One team for the 2008 season and on 28 April 2006, Prodrive were officially granted entry when the FIA announced the list of entrants to the 2008 Formula One World Championship. However, on 22 November 2007, he was forced to announce that Prodrive F1 would not be competing in the 2008 Formula One World Championship after a lack of clarity over the legality of 'customer cars' and the threat of possible legal action. In May 2009, Prodrive also applied for an entry for the 2010 F1 World Championship, however, all three new entries were given to teams using Cosworth engines, while Prodrive already had an agreement to use Mercedes engines.

World Rally Championship
In 1999, Richards sold 49% of Prodrive to the private equity firm Apax Partners.  In 2000 he acquired the television rights to the World Rally Championship with the acquisition of International Sportsworld Communicators (ISC) from Bernie Ecclestone. He sold these rights on to North One TV in 2006.

Aston Martin
On 12 March 2007, Richards led a consortium of investors including Investment Dar and Adeem Investment, raising $925 million to finance the purchase of Aston Martin from Ford. Richards subsequently became chairman of the car company.  He stepped down from this role at the end of 2013.

Technology

More recently Prodrive has expanded to undertake a wide range of advanced technology projects in the aerospace, marine and defence industries, including the development of low carbon technologies, lightweight composite structures and niche vehicle design with specific expertise in electric vehicles. The business was a technical partner to the Land Rover BAR team and developed the control systems for Britain's America's Cup entry. Prodrive helped Ford create the first hybrid Ford Transit van and today is working on everything from complex control systems for commercial jet engines and hypercars to ballistic protection systems for the UK's armed forces.

Prodrive also has a composites business in Milton Keynes making lightweight carbon composites for car manufacturers as well as aerospace businesses. The company is also developing sustainable alternatives to carbon fibre such as flax, as well as recycling carbon fibre composites.

Recent history
On 16 September 2007 Richards and his wife, Karen, survived a forced landing in their helicopter in Essex whilst returning from the 2007 Belgian Grand Prix, less than 24 hours after his former WRC driver, Colin McRae, perished in a similar accident along with his son and two others. Based on Prodrive's statement after the incident, Richards was piloting Prodrive's Eurocopter EC 135. Both Richards and his wife Karen walked away unharmed.

In July 2010 it was announced the Richards' Prodrive business would take MINI into the World Rally Championship in 2011, using the new MINI Countryman as its base. The team was unveiled in April 2011 and first competed as the MINI WRC Team at the Italian Rally in Sardinia in May 2011.  In 2013, Prodrive created the MINI RX, a 450 bhp rallycross car based on the MINI WRC.  It won on its debut at the Munich X Games in July 2013. In 2018 Prodrive created the Megane RX, for GC Kompetition for the FIA World Rallycross Championship, which it continues to compete in today.

At the end of 2012 Richards and his wife acquired the Idle Rocks hotel in St Mawes, Cornwall. After a multimillion-pound refurbishment the hotel reopened in the summer of 2013. It is now a Relais and Chateaux Hotel and in 2014 it was voted one of the 50 best beach hotels in Europe by the Sunday Times Travel Magazine. In 2018 it was awarded Britain's top Seafood Restaurant. Richards acquired a second hotel in the village in 2013, the St Mawes Hotel.

In May 2015, Richards relocated his Prodrive business from its previous site by the M40 motorway at Banbury, UK to a new facility also alongside the M40 in the same town.

Honorary qualifications

University of Warwick: Honorary Degree of Master of Arts
Cranfield School of Management: Honorary Doctor of Science degree
Coventry University: Honorary Doctor of Technology
University of Wales: Bangor: Honorary Fellowship
University of Wales Institute, Cardiff: Honorary Fellowship
Myerscough College: Honorary Fellowship

Other interests
Richards is a Patron of Hope for Tomorrow, a UK charity dedicated to bringing cancer care closer to patients' homes via Mobile Cancer Care Units (MCCUs). 
Member of Advisory Board, Cranfield School of Management
Chairman of the Tom Pryce Memorial Trust
Chairman of trustees of the British Racing Drivers Club Motor Sport Charity
Vice-President of the Llangollen International Musical Eisteddfod
Patron of Greenpower Education Trust
Vice-President of BEN, the Motor and Allied Trades Benevolent Fund 
President of Clwyd Vale Motor Club in North Wales
Member of the Royal Academy
President of Truro & District Motor Club based in Cornwall

Footnotes

References

1952 births
Living people
20th-century Welsh businesspeople
21st-century Welsh businesspeople
Welsh motorsport people
World Rally Championship people
Welsh rally drivers
British rally co-drivers
Commanders of the Order of the British Empire
Apax Partners
Aston Martin
Formula One team owners
Formula One team principals
Benetton Formula